Roller Derby Skate Corp is an American manufacturer and distributor of sporting goods, specializing in quad skates, inline skates, ice hockey skates, skateboards, skating accessories, and recently, through its acquisition of 360 Inc., sporting goods for water sports including body boards, surfboards and swim products. Roller Derby sells products under the brands Roller Derby, California Advanced Sports, Pacer and 360 Inc. It is the second-largest supplier of inline skates to the U.S. market. They have just introduced a skate that is designed for roller derby.

Roller Derby is the largest manufacturer of roller skates in the United States.

History
Roller Derby was founded in 1936 by Oscar Seltzer, the brother of Roller Derby pioneer Leo Seltzer, as a manufacturer of boots for roller and ice skates.

Initially, the company had a single plant in Litchfield, Illinois. The company opened an additional assembly plant in California in 1953, followed by offices, warehouses, and a distribution center in Atglen, Pennsylvania in 1971. The company eventually moved manufacturing operations overseas, first to Taiwan, then to mainland China. Its U.S. manufacturing facilities were converted to offices, warehouses and distribution centers. The company is still based in Litchfield, Illinois.

See also
Roller Derby Skateboard
Competitors
K2 Skates
Riedell Skates
Rollerblade
Salomon Group  (no longer in skate business)

References

  History of Roller Derby Skate Corp.
 Hoovers

External links
Roller Derby homepage.
Roller Derby, Historical Society of Montgomery County Illinois

Privately held companies based in Illinois